The Journal of Evaluation in Clinical Practice is a quarterly peer-reviewed medical journal covering the evaluation of clinical practice in all medical and health disciplines. It was established in 1995 and is published by Wiley-Blackwell. The editor-in-chief is Mathew Mercuri ([University of Toronto]). According to the Journal Citation Reports, the journal has a 2015 impact factor of 1.053, ranking it 15th out of 20 journals in the category "Medical informatics".

References

External links

Wiley-Blackwell academic journals
Publications established in 1995
Biomedical informatics journals
Clinical practice journals
Quarterly journals
English-language journals